Protoduar is a village in the former municipality of Kutalli in Berat County, Albania. At the 2015 local government reform it became part of the municipality Dimal.

References

Populated places in Dimal, Albania
Villages in Berat County